James Church Cropsey (1872 - June 16, 1937) was a New York City Police Commissioner and a New York State Supreme Court judge.

References

1937 deaths
1872 births
New York Supreme Court Justices
New York City Police Commissioners
Kings County District Attorneys